Ryan Lamont Benjamin (born April 23, 1970) is a former American football running back who played one season with the Cincinnati Bengals of the National Football League (NFL). He first enrolled at the College of the Sequoias before transferring to the University of the Pacific. He attended Tulare Union High School in Tulare, California. Benjamin was also a member of the Shreveport Pirates of the Canadian Football League (CFL) and Memphis Pharaohs/Portland Forest Dragons of the Arena Football League (AFL).

College career
Benjamin first played college football for the College of the Sequoias Giants.

He played for the Pacific Tigers of the University of the Pacific from 1990 to 1992. He earned Big West Conference Offensive Player of the Year honors in 1991 and 1992. Benjamin led NCAA Division I-A in all-purpose yardage and became the first player in conference history to record 50 passes while rushing for at least 1,500 yards. His 2,996 all-purpose yards were second only to Barry Sanders' NCAA record in 1988. He was named Pacific's first Associated Press First Team All-American and was also the second player in Big West Conference history to earn the honor. Benjamin garnered AP and UPI All-America Second Team recognition after rushing for 1,441 yards and compiling 2,597 all-purpose yards his senior year in 1992. He was inducted into the Pacific Athletics Hall of Fame as part of the 2004-05 class.

Professional career
Benjamin was signed by the Cincinnati Bengals on April 28, 1993 after going undrafted in the 1993 NFL Draft. He played in one game for the Bengals during the 1993 season. He was released by the Bengals on August 10, 1994.

Benjamin signed with the Shreveport Pirates in August 1994 and played for the team during the 1994 season.

Benjamin was a member of the Memphis Pharaohs/Portland Forest Dragons from 1995 to 1999. He was named team captain and earned team MVP honors. He left the team after the 1998 season.

References

External links
Just Sports Stats
College stats

Living people
1970 births
Players of American football from California
American football running backs
Canadian football running backs
African-American players of American football
African-American players of Canadian football
College of the Sequoias Giants football players
Pacific Tigers football players
Cincinnati Bengals players
Shreveport Pirates players
Memphis Pharaohs players
Portland Forest Dragons players
Sportspeople from Tulare County, California
21st-century African-American sportspeople
20th-century African-American sportspeople